Eclipta quadrispinosa is a species of beetle in the family Cerambycidae. It was described by Gounelle in 1913.

References

Eclipta (beetle)
Beetles described in 1913